Honduras competed at the 2020 Summer Olympics in Tokyo. Originally scheduled to take place from 24 July to 9 August 2020, the Games were postponed to 23 July to 8 August 2021, because of the COVID-19 pandemic. It was the nation's twelfth appearance at the Summer Olympics.

Competitors
The following is the list of number of competitors participating in the Games. Note that reserves in football are not counted:

Athletics

Honduras received a universality slot from the World Athletics to send a male athlete to the Olympics. 

Track & road events

Football

Summary

Men's tournament

Honduras men's football team qualified for the Olympics by advancing to the final match of the 2020 CONCACAF Men's Olympic Qualifying Championship in Mexico.

Team roster

Group play

Judo

Honduras received an invitation from the Tripartite Commission and the International Judo Federation to send Cergia David Güity in the women's half-middleweight category (63 kg) to the Olympics.

Swimming

Honduras received a universality invitation from FINA to send two top-ranked swimmers (one per gender) in their respective individual events to the Olympics, based on the FINA Points System of June 28, 2021.

Taekwondo
 
Honduras received an invitation from the Tripartite Commission and the World Taekwondo Federation to send Keila Avila in the women's heavyweight category (+67 kg) to the Olympics.

See also
Honduras at the 2019 Pan American Games

References

Nations at the 2020 Summer Olympics
2020
2021 in Honduran sport